Nicolás Cámara Vales (1875 — 1956) was a Mexican liberal politician, diplomat and physician who served as governor of Yucatán on two occasions between 1911 and 1913 during the Mexican Revolution. 

After graduating from the University of Berlin as a Doctor of Medicine, he returned to Mérida where he specialized in pediatrics, opening the first children's hospital in the Yucatán Peninsula. After 1909, he joined José María Pino Suárez, his brother-in-law, campaigning in favor of Francisco I. Madero who wanted to democratize Mexico. After Madero and Pino Suárez were elected to the presidency and vice-presidency, Cámara served twice as governor of Yucatán, first on an interim basis before being elected to his own term. After the Ten Tragic Days, a military putsch, the Madero administration was overthrown and Madero and Pino Suárez were assassinated. 

Cámara spent several years in exile in Europe and the United States were he continued to practice medicine. During the interwar years, he served as Consul-General in Berlin and Vienna. Having founded the Henequen Regulatory Commission during his governorship, he later served as its chairman.

Biography

Family Origins 
Born in Mérida, Yucatán on 25 April 1875, the eldest son of Raymundo Cámara Luján, a wealthy landowner and businessman who made a fortune during the henequen boom, and María del Carmen Vales Castillo. His maternal uncle was Agustín Vales Castillo, a Yucatecan industrialist and banker who served as the Mayor of Mérida between 1902 and 1907.
 
A descendant of the House of Cámara, his paternal family was an old patrician family which could claim descent from several of the military commanders who had participated in Spanish Conquest of Yucatán. He was a direct line descendant of Juan de la Cámara, the Spanish conquistador and nobleman who had been one of the founders of Mérida in 1542. He was also a descendant of Francisco de Montejo, Álvar Núñez Cabeza de Vaca, Gaspar and Melchor Pachecho, among others.

María Cámara Vales, his elder sister, earned the Belisario Domínguez Medal of Honor in 1969. Her husband, José María Pino Suárez served as Vice President of Mexico between 1911 and 1913.

Alfredo Cámara Vales, his younger brother, served as Governor of the Federal Territory of Quintana Roo.

Hortensia Cámara Vales, his younger sister, was a concert pianist. She married Pablo Castellanos León also a noted virtuoso pianist who studied at the Conservatoire de Paris under Antoine François Marmontel. Their son, Pablo Castellanos Cámara was also a distinguished virtuoso pianist who studied at the Paris and Berlin Conservatories under Alfred Cortot and Edwin Fischer, respectively. Nicolás was also the uncle of Fernando Cámara Barbachano, the distinguished anthropologist.

Alfredo Pino Cámara, another nephew, was a distinguished jurist, who served as  associate justice of the Supreme Court of Justice of the Nation and was the judge responsible for instructing the famous murder case against Tina Modotti, the Italian communist photographer. Similarly, his grandnephew, Ismael Moreno Pino,  was a lawyer and senior diplomat who served as Undersecretary of Foreign Affairs and was the Mexican Ambassador to Germany and the Netherlands.

Education 
The eldest of thirteen siblings, the Cámara Vales brothers were educated in a household which emphasized learning music and foreign languages; he played the violin and piano and spoke fluent English, Spanish, French and German. He earned a Doctor of Medicine degree at the University of Berlin in Germany, graduating with the thesis "The Pellagra in Yucatán" (1896).

Marriage and Descendants 
He married Joaquina Millet Heredia. She was the daughter of José María Millet Hübbe, a prosperous businessman of French, German and Danish origin, and Joaquina Heredia Cacaño. The couple had two sons and a daughter:

 Berta Cámara Millet
 Nicolás Cámara Millet
 Jorge Carlos Cámara Millet

Career 
Having specialised in pediatrics, he returned to Mérida and opened the first children's hospital in the Yucatán peninsula.

His liberal ideals identified him with Francisco I. Madero, a close friend of the Cámara family and of his brother-in-law, José María Pino Suárez. A member of the Progressive Constitutionalist Party, he campaigned in his native state for the Maderista cause.  During the gubernatorial election (1911), Cámara Vales was instrumental in convincing much of the Yucatecan oligarchy to transfer their allegiance to José María Pino Suárez, who won the governorship despite a tight race against Delio Moreno Cantón. The gubernatorial term of Pino Suárez was cut short, however, when he was elected to the vice-presidency of the Republic as a result of the 1911 federal extraordinary elections. After Pino Suárez resigned as governor, the local legislature appointed Cámara Vales as interim governor of Yucatán. As interim governor, Cámara Vales organized the 1912 local extraordinary elections. Deciding to stand as a candidate, he resigned from the governorship so as not to influence the outcome, being replaced by Agustín Patrón Correa.

After winning the 1912 local election, he returned to power. During his brief term as governor, his most important achievement was ordering the creation of the Henequen Regulatory Commission (Comisión Regulatoria de la Industria del Henequen). During the latter half of the 19th Century and the first years of the 20th century, the lucrative henequen industry had been the principal export of the Yucatán Peninsula. Olegario Molina, a powerful former governor, had manipulated prices to his own advantage in detriment of other competitors virtually creating a monopoly. The purpose of the commission was to regulate the henequen industry and avoid price manipulation and other such corrupt practices.

A teetotaller, he also founded a society to advocate for abstinence through the press, public meetings and anti-alcoholic literature. The society performed good service for a number of years but declined after Cámara's exile in Europe.

In January 1913, he temporarily relinquished power in order to visit his sister, María Cámara, in Mexico City. During his visit, Fernando Solís León, the Mayor of Mérida, took over as acting governor.  While he was in the Capital, a coup d'état, known as the Ten Tragic Days, overthrew the Madero administration. The Huerta military dictatorship ordered the former president and vice-president to be assassinated on February 22, 1913. Persecuted by the new government, Nicolás returned to Mérida with his sister and nephews. Soon afterward, he left Yucatán on a steamboat heading for Havana. Like other members of the Madero and Pino-Cámara families, he remained exiled in the United States and Europe during the remainder of the Mexican Revolution.

During the Interwar period, he held various positions in the diplomatic service, representing his country as Consul General in Berlin and Vienna. Returning to Yucatán after many years abroad, he served as the chairman of the Henequen Regulatory Commission.

He died in Mexico City in 1956, aged 81.

References 

1875 births
1956 deaths
Politicians from Yucatán (state)
People from Mérida, Yucatán
Governors of Yucatán (state)
20th-century Mexican politicians
Mexican people of Spanish descent